The Kharkiv model V-2 was a Soviet diesel tank V-12 engine, the V angle at 60°, with dual overhead camshafts per bank,four valves per cylinder opened by bucket style followers and direct fuel injection, features found on modern high performance diesel engines. Designed at the Kharkiv Locomotive Factory by Konstantin Chelpan and his team. It is found in the BT-7M (BT-8), T-34, KV, IS and IS-10 (T-10) tanks, and by extension, the vehicles based on them, such as the SU-85 and SU-100 tank destroyers based on the T-34 and the ISU-122 and ISU-152 self-propelled guns based on the IS-2. Throughout its production life, output ranged from roughly 450-700 hp. The engine was made of aluminium. The engine cooling system was liquid, of a closed type. It included a water jacket of the cylinder blocks; water radiators; a water pump; a centrifugal fan; a t-valve with steam and air valves, and piping. The cooling system capacity was 90- 95 liters. The radiators were connected to the surrounding air via an air valve. The t-valve, leading to both radiators, was designed for filling the cooling system with coolant.

Displacement , bore , stroke  left cylinder group and  right cylinder group, torque .

Variants
 V-2: Initial production version, 1937. Used in the BT-7M (BT-8).
 V-2-34: V-2 with revised hull mounts, fuel and cooling connectors and refined clutch, 1939. Used in the T-34, SU-85 and SU-100, it produced 500 hp (370 kW) @ 1800 RPM. The following units were attached to the engine: fuel feed pump; fuel filter; fuel pump NK-1; high-pressure fuel line; oil pump; oil filter; water pump, and alternator. The starting of the engine could be carried out using the electric starter ST-700 (the main method), or compressed air (the alternate method) using the two air cylinders located in the driver’s compartment.

 V-2K: V-2 with increased injection pressure and higher engine speed, 1939. Used in the KV-1 and KV-2, it produced 600 hp at 2,000 rpm.
 V-2V: V-2 detuned for use in lighter vehicles, 1940. Used in the Voroshilovets artillery tractor, it produced 375 hp.
 V-2L/P: V-2 modified for boats, not built.
 V-2SN (Нагнетатель системы, supercharger systems): V-2 with a supercharger from the Mikulin AM-38 aircraft engine, 1940. Used in the KV-3, it produced 862 hp.
 V-2-10 (V-2IS): V-2 with stronger cylinders and heads, improved fuel pump, larger radiator and oil cooler and modified hull mounts, 1943. Used in the IS-2, IS-3, ISU-122 and ISU-152, and T-10, it produced 520 hp.
 V-2-450AV-S3: V-2 modified for oil drilling equipment, it produced 450 hp.

History of development and production
The V-2 started development in 1931 until 1939 by design team of the diesel department of the Kharkiv Locomotive Works, first under the leadership of Konstantin Chelpan, who was arrested in 1938. Work was passed down to his deputy for project work, Yakov Efimovich Vikhman, and Ivan Yakovlevich Trashutin, his deputy for experimental and production work, who completed development of the engine in 1939. Near the end of the 20th century, the V-2 was fitted with more modern modifications by the chief designer of the head design bureau for the Chelyabinsk Tractor Plant, Vladimir Ivanovich Butov.

Serial production for the V-2 begun on September 1st, 1939. The Red Army adopted the V-2 engine in the same year in three modifications: the V-2 (500hp), the V-2K (600hp) for the KV line of tanks and the V-2V (375hp).

See also
 Maybach HL230, equivalent contemporary German tank engine
 Rolls-Royce Meteor, equivalent contemporary British tank engine

References

Notes

Sources
 

Diesel engines by model
World War II armoured fighting vehicles of the Soviet Union
Tank engines
Malyshev Factory products